İDO Istanbul Fast Ferries Co. Inc. (meaning Istanbul Sea Buses) was founded in 1987 by the Istanbul Metropolitan Municipality. Originally established with a fleet of 10 seabuses built by the Kvaerner Fjellstrand shipyard of Norway, the İDO today has a fleet of 25 seabuses (with capacities ranging from 350 to 450 passengers) designed by Kvaerner Fjellstrand, Austal and the Damen Group; 10 high-speed car ferries (1200 passengers and 225 vehicles) designed by Austal and the Damen Group; 18 car ferries; 32 commuter ferries; and 1 large passenger ship. At present, the İDO is the world's largest commuter ferry operator with its 87-passenger ships and 86 piers. The company owns a total of 103 ships including its service vessels.

In 2011, the company was privatized for 30 years by the Istanbul Metropolitan Municipality.

Fare system

The İDO uses several systems to manage trip fare. Since the conventional boats are scheduled on intracity lines and are roughly connected with other rapid transport systems such as the Istanbul Metro and İETT Buses, passengers simply pass through pay gates. There is no pre-reservation or assigned seating and admission is fairly cheap. The pay system is integrated with the AKBİL passenger cards (smart tickets) which are also valid for all other means of public transport in Istanbul that are operated by the Metropolitan Municipality.

Seabuses are more expensive and they are not as frequently used as the conventional commuter ferries. Passengers pay the fare at the pay gates and AKBİLs are valid. The procedure is the same for the intercity seabus lines. There are no assigned seats for the passengers.

Fast car ferries and conventional vehicle carriers also carry passengers with no assigned seat numbers; however, in the high-speed car ferries, there are separate sections for the Economy Class (downstairs) and First Class (upstairs) tickets. Conventional carriers do not require pre-reservation. Passengers are suggested to reserve their seat and car slot beforehand, although there is no assigned seating in the double-ended fast ferries.

In an effort to improve customer satisfaction and the overall management of the fare system, İDO plans to switch to a dynamic pricing system similar to those of airline companies. Dynamic pricing implies that ticket prices will vary as the trip time approaches.

İDO tickets can be bought from online ticket/travel agencies such as Bilet.com. In this case customers could be charged a small service fee in accordance with the conditions of ticket sale accord. Dynamic pricing system of İDO is also available to a small number of select online ticket agencies.

Fleet

Fast Ferry

İDO has total of 10 fast ferries.
The average age of the fast ferry fleet is 5.5 years.

Seabuses

İDO has total of 25 seabuses.
The average age of the seabus fleet is 12.4 years.

Car Ferries

Overall

Routes

Images of the Seabus models

References

External links
 İDO homepage (English)
  Fleet and Terminals at İDO
 Map of Ferry terminals at İDO
 Buy Online İDO Tickets
 İDO Ferry timetables
 İDO Online Ticket

Transport in Istanbul
Ferry companies of Turkey
Companies based in Istanbul
Transport companies established in 1987
Turkish brands
Turkish companies established in 1987